One Night or 1 Night may refer to:

Film
 One Night (2002 film), a film produced by Winchester Films 
 One Night (2005 film), an Iranian film directed by Niki Karimi
 One Night (2007 film), a film featuring Christian Campbell and Billy Lush
 One Night (2009 film), a Canadian short film directed by Shelagh Carter
 One Night (2010 film), a film featuring Olivier Gruner
 One Night (2012 film), a Belgian-French film directed by Lucas Belvaux
 1 Night (film), a 2016 American film directed by Minhal Baig

Music

Albums
 One Night (Greg Brown album), 1983
 One Night (J. C. Jones album), 1998
 One Night, by ELO Part II, 1996
 One Night, by Arlo Guthrie, 1978

Songs
 "One Night" (Elvis Presley song), 1958
 "One Night" (Lil Yachty song), 2015
 "One Night" (WTS song), 2016
 "One Night", by the Corrs from In Blue, 2000
 "One Night", by Griff, 2021
 "One Night", by Jay Sean from Me Against Myself, 2004
 "One Night", by Joan Armatrading from Secret Secrets, 1985
 "One Night", by Matthew Koma, 2013
 "One Night", by MK, 2019
 "One Night", by Picture This, 2019
 "One Night", by Shimica Wong, 2010
 "One Night", by Travis from The Boy with No Name, 2007
 "1 Night", by Mura Masa from Mura Masa, 2017
 "1Night", by Stargate, 2018
 "#1Nite (One Night)", by Cobra Starship from Night Shades, 2011

Television
 One Night (British TV series), a 2012 drama series
 One Night (Norwegian TV series), a 2018 drama series
 "One Night" (Cold Case), an episode
 "One Night" (Sanctuary), an episode

Games
 One Night, a variant of Mafia (party game) from gamemaker Bézier Games
 One Night Trilogy, a series of indie survival horror games

See also
 One Night Only (disambiguation)
 One-night stand (disambiguation)